Basilar part (pars basilaris) can refer to:
 Basilar part of occipital bone (pars basilaris ossis occipitalis)
 Basilar part of pons (pars basilaris pontis)